Heritage Shunters Trust (HST) is a trading name of The South Yorkshire Railway Co. Ltd. which was founded in 1989.

Overview
HST is a railway preservation society and is the only preservation society that specialises in the preservation of ex-British Railway diesel shunters in the United Kingdom although they do have a Class 14 which is a Type 1 locomotive and not a shunter. 

Most of the locomotives are kept at Rowsley, Derbyshire, England, on the site of preserved railway Peak Rail but the company is a separate outfit. Galas are usually held twice a year where the collection is put on display and brake van rides are hauled by an assortment from the active fleet. Guided tours of the collection, and the viewing of restoration work being undertaken, are available most weekends for a small charge.

Diesel locomotives
HST has the following locomotives.

Ex-British Rail
 British Rail Class 01   No.  D2953 (First diesel loco to be sold by BR into private industry & pioneer 01) 
 British Rail Class 02   Nos. D2854, D2866.
 British Rail Class 03   Nos. 03027, 03037, 03099, 03113, D2139,03180, D2199
 British Rail Class 04   Nos. D2205, D2229, D2272 Alfie, D2284, D2289 (imported and repatriated from Italy), D2337 Dorothy (Includes one of each of the sub-classes of the 04 design)
 British Rail Class 05   No.  D2587
 British Rail Class 06   No.  06003 (The only survivor of this class)
 British Rail Class 07   No.  07001 (Pioneer 07)
 British Rail Class 08   No.  08016 from the first batch.
 British Rail Class 09   No.  09001 (Pioneer 09)
 British Rail Class 14   Nos. D9525
 British Rail Class 97/6 Nos. 97650, 97654 (Includes pioneer PWM)

Industrial
 John Fowler & Co., Bigga, (built 1947, rebuilt by Thomas Hill (Rotherham) Ltd in 1960)
 Yorkshire Engine Company, BSC No.2, Rotherham (Not currently on public display)

See also
 Railway enthusiasts societies in the United Kingdom

References

External links
 

1989 establishments in England
Organizations established in 1989
Clubs and societies in Derbyshire
Heritage railways in Derbyshire